1992–93 saw Boca Juniors win the Apertura, it was their first official league title since 1981. The Clausura was won by Vélez Sársfield, their first title since 1968.

Torneo Apertura ("Opening" Tournament)

Top Scorers

Relegation

There is no relegation after the Apertura. For the relegation results of this tournament see below

Torneo Clausura ("Closing" Tournament)

Notes
Velez 1-1 Boca: Awarded to Velez 1-0
Talleres 2-2 River Plate: Awarded to River 0-2
Newell's 0-1 Talleres: Awarded to Newell's 1-0
Talleres 1-0 Gimnasia La Plata: Awarded 0-1 to Gimnasia

Top Scorers

Relegation

Argentine clubs in international competitions

References

Argentina 1992-1993 by Pablo Ciullini  at rsssf.
Argentina 1990s by Osvaldo José Gorgazzi and Victor Hugo Kurhy at rsssf.
Copa CONMEBOL 1992 by Juan Pablo Andrés and Julio Bovi Diogo at rsssf.
Copa Libertadores 1993 by Juan Pablo Andrés and Frank Ballesteros at rsssf.

 

it:Campionato di calcio argentino 1992-1993
pl:I liga argentyńska w piłce nożnej (1992/1993)